Forest Junction is an unincorporated census-designated place in the town of Brillion, Calumet County, Wisconsin, United States. As of the 2010 census, its population was 616.

The community has its own water tower and utilities. Its ZIP code is 54123.

History
A post office called Forest Junction has been in operation since 1873. The community was so named from its location at a rail junction near the forest.

Geography
Forest Junction is located at the intersection of Wisconsin Highway 57/Wisconsin Highway 32 and U.S. Route 10. 57/32 runs north-south through the area, and 10 runs east-west.

Notable people
Bernard E. Brandt, farmer and Wisconsin state legislator, was born in Forest Junction.
Silas J. Kloehn, orthodontist
Alvin Ott, member of the Wisconsin State Assembly

References

Census-designated places in Calumet County, Wisconsin
Census-designated places in Wisconsin